John Watson was a politician in Queensland, Australia. He was a Member of the Queensland Legislative Assembly.

References

Members of the Queensland Legislative Assembly
Burials at Toowong Cemetery
1833 births
1912 deaths